Simple-type schizophrenia is a sub-type of schizophrenia included in the International Classification of Diseases (ICD-10), in which it is classified as a mental and behaviour disorder. It is not included in the current Diagnostic and Statistical Manual of Mental Disorders (DSM-5) or the upcoming ICD-11, effective 1 January 2022. Simple-type schizophrenia is characterized by negative ("deficit") symptoms, such as avolition, apathy, anhedonia, reduced affect display, lack of initiative, lack of motivation, low activity; with absence of hallucinations or delusions of any kind.

Simple schizophrenia was included as a proposed diagnosis for further study in the appendix of the former DSM-IV.

Signs and symptoms
It has possibly the earliest onset compared to all other schizophrenias, considered to begin in some within childhood. Symptoms of schizophrenia simplex include an absence of will, impoverished thinking and flattening of affect. There is a gradual deterioration of functioning with increased amotivation and reduced socialization. It is considered to be rarely diagnosed and is a schizophrenia without psychotic symptoms.

In a study of patients in a Massachusetts hospital, persons with simple schizophrenia were found to make attempts at reality fulfillment with respect to the more primitive needs; tending toward the achievement of fulfillment of these needs rather than engaging in fantasy as is typically found as a reaction to environmental stimuli by the psychotic person.

Causes

A progressive state of simple schizophrenia results often in cases of adolescent onset juvenile general paresis. Paresis is caused by placental-foetal transfer of infection and results in intellectual (mental) subnormality. Occurrence of this type of paresis is altogether uncommon (Lishman 1998).

Diagnosis

Classification

ICD 
The WHO first listed the condition in the 6th revision of the International Classification of Diseases ICD-6 (1949) and it stayed in the manual until the present version ICD-10.

ICD-9 
The ICD-9 simple-type schizophrenia description:

ICD-10 
These are the current criteria:

The ICD is currently in revision 10, and the ICD-11 was accepted in May 2019 will come into effect in 2022. In the ICD-11, there is no longer a diagnostic category of simple schizophrenia, and all subtypes of schizophrenia have been eliminated.

DSM 
Simple-type schizophrenia also appeared in the first two editions of the DSM as an official diagnosis:

But after that, it was omitted in later versions and has since then never returned as a formal diagnosis in any DSM. However, DSM-IV (1994) and DSM-IV-TR (2000) included Simple Schizophrenia in the appendix under the proposed category of simple deteriorative disorder. The provisional research criteria for it were:

Treatment
The use of antipsychotic medication is commonly the first line of treatment; however, the effectiveness after treatment is in question.

L-DOPA is effective against reduced affect display and emotional withdrawal, aloofness from society, apathy.

History 
The early idea that a person with schizophrenia might present solely with symptoms and indications of deterioration (i.e. presenting with no accessory symptoms) was identified as dementia simplex.

ICD-10 specifies the continuation of symptoms for a period of two years in the diagnosis of simple schizophrenia. This is because of disagreement on the classification validity of the sub-type, that having been retained by the ICD classification, has been omitted from DSM classifications. Symptoms identified earlier to dementia simplex are now DSM-attributed by way of improvements in diagnostic technique to other classifications such as neurodegenerative disorders.

Early observations that concur with symptoms of the dementia praecox of the form classified later as simplex began in 1838 with Jean Esquirol. In 1860, Bénédict Morel introduced the term dementia précoce and Langdon Down provided  in 1887 the most complete description to that date of the clinical manifestation that Charpentier described in 1890 as dementia précoce simple des enfant normaux.

The description of simple schizophrenia is inter-changeable with describing symptoms as a form of dementia praecox known as simple dementing, at least in the time when the Swiss psychiatrists Otto Diem and Eugen Bleuler were studying it. In 1893, Emil Kraepelin considered there were four types of schizophrenia, and was amongst the first to identify three of them (dementia hebephrenica, dementia paranoides, dementia catatonica). The simplex type was added by Eugen Bleuler to the earlier ones identified by Kraepelin in 1899 and subsequently given a basic outline in 1903 by Otto Diem publishing a monograph on dementia praecox in the simple dementing form. This was based on a survey of two males having had a relatively normal childhood but who then fell into patterns of living tending towards vagrancy.

A description of a cerebral disorder in relation to organic factors and in the context of general paralysis of the insane only; with no reference to schizophrenia, shows a disorder with features of generalized dementia (Lishman 1998). In 1951, a film was made showing the clinical characteristics of simple-type schizophrenia.

Controversy
Definition of this type of schizophrenia is without unity or is controversial. The diagnosis was discontinued in the DSM system, although it was recommended for reinclusion in 1989. It was subsequently confirmed as having imprecise diagnostic criteria based on collective descriptions lacking in agreement.

However, in an experiment with a small sample size, five patients with a diagnosis of simple deteriorative disorder (DSM-IV) were found to have grey matter deficits, atrophy and reduced cerebral perfusion in the frontal areas. Whitwell et al. found justification to retain the classification on the basis of fulfillment of "dimensional" considerations of classification, as opposed to criticisms resulting from disagreement in considerations of classification using orientation from other categories.

References

External links 

Psychosis
Schizophrenia